Vitor Gabriel may refer to:

 Vitor Gabriel (footballer, born 1997), Brazilian football midfielder for Mafra
 Vitor Gabriel (footballer, born 2000), Brazilian football forward for Juventude

See also
 Victor Gabriel (born 2004), Brazilian football defender for Sport Recife